Biblical studies is the academic application of a set of diverse disciplines to the study of the Bible (the Old Testament and New Testament). For its theory and methods, the field draws on disciplines ranging from ancient history, historical criticism, philology, textual criticism, literary criticism, historical backgrounds, mythology, and comparative religion.

Many secular as well as religious universities and colleges offer courses in biblical studies, usually in departments of religious studies, theology, Judaic studies, history, or comparative literature. Biblical scholars do not necessarily have a faith commitment to the texts they study, but many do.

Definition

The Oxford Handbook of Biblical Studies defines the field as a set of various, and in some cases independent disciplines for the study of the collection of ancient texts generally known as the Bible. These disciplines include but are not limited to historical criticism, archaeology, hermeneutics, textual criticism, cultural anthropology, history, the history of interpretation, sociology, theology, and patristics.

Academic societies

Several academic associations and societies promote research in the field. The largest is the Society of Biblical Literature (SBL) with around 8,500 members in more than 80 countries. It publishes many books and journals in the biblical studies, including its flagship, the Journal of Biblical Literature. SBL hosts one academic conference in North America and another international conference each year, as well as smaller regional meetings. Others include the European Association of Biblical Studies, the Evangelical Theological Society, the Institute for Biblical Research, the American Schools of Oriental Research, and the Catholic Biblical Association.

Biblical criticism

Biblical criticism is the scholarly "study and investigation of biblical writings that seeks to make discerning judgments about these writings". Viewing biblical texts as being ordinary pieces of literature, rather than set apart from other literature, as in the traditional view, it asks when and where a particular text originated; how, why, by whom, for whom, and in what circumstances it was produced; what influences were at work in its production; what sources were used in its composition; and what message it was intended to convey. It will vary slightly depending on whether the focus is on the Hebrew Bible, the Old Testament, the letters of New Testament or the canonical gospels. It also plays an important role in the quest for a historical Jesus.

It also addresses the physical text, including the meaning of the words and the way in which they are used, its preservation, history and integrity. Biblical criticism draws upon a wide range of scholarly disciplines including archaeology, anthropology, folklore, comparative religion, Oral Tradition studies, and historical and religious studies.

Textual criticism

Textual criticism is a branch of textual scholarship, philology, and literary criticism that is concerned with the identification and removal of transcription errors in texts, both manuscripts and printed books. Ancient scribes made errors or alterations when copying manuscripts by hand. Given a manuscript copy, several or many copies, but not the original document, the textual critic seeks to reconstruct the original text (the urtext, archetype or autograph) as closely as possible. The same processes can be used to attempt to reconstruct intermediate editions, or recensions, of a document's transcription history. The ultimate objective of the textual critic's work is the production of a "critical edition" containing a text most closely approximating the original.

There are three fundamental approaches to textual criticism: eclecticism, stemmatics, and copy-text editing. Techniques from the biological discipline of cladistics are currently also being used to determine the relationships between manuscripts.

The phrase "lower criticism" is used to describe the contrast between textual criticism and "higher criticism", which is the endeavor to establish the authorship, date, and place of composition of the original text.

History of the Bible

Historical research has often dominated modern biblical studies. Biblical scholars usually try to interpret a particular text within its original historical context and use whatever information is available to reconstruct that setting. Historical criticism aims to determine the provenance, authorship, and process by which ancient texts were composed. Famous theories of historical criticism include the documentary hypothesis, which suggests that the Pentateuch was compiled from four different written sources, and different reconstructions of "the historical Jesus", which are based primarily on the differences between the canonical Gospels.

Original languages

The Hebrew Bible, the textual basis of the Christian Old Testament (although with order rearranged and some books split into two), was written in Biblical Hebrew, although a few chapters were written in Biblical Aramaic. Deuterocanonical books removed from the Old Testament in some Protestant Christian Bibles are variously written in Hebrew, Greek or Aramaic. The New Testament was written in Koine Greek, with possible Aramaic undertones, as was the first translation of the Hebrew Bible known as the Septuagint or Greek Old Testament. Therefore, Hebrew, Greek and sometimes Aramaic continue to be taught in most universities, colleges and seminaries with strong programs in biblical studies.

See also
 Biblical hermeneutics
 Biblical theology
 Bible study (Christianity)
 Chronology of the Bible
 Doctor of Biblical Studies
 Exegesis
 Historicity of the Bible

References

Further reading
 The Cambridge History of the Bible, 3 vols., eds. P. R. Ackroyd, C. F. Evans, S. L. Greenslade and G. W. H. Lampe. Cambridge: Cambridge University Press, 1963, 1969, 1970.
 Frei, Hans. The Eclipse of Biblical Narrative: A Study in Eighteenth and Nineteenth Century Hermeneutics. New Haven: Yale, 1974.
 Grant, Patrick. 1989. Reading the New Testament. London: MacMillan. 
 Greenspahn, Frederick E. "Biblical Scholars, Medieval and Modern," in J. Neusner et al. (eds.), Judaic Perspectives on Ancient Israel (Philadelphia: Fortress, 1987), pp. 245–258.
 Harrison, Peter. The Bible, Protestantism, and the Rise of Natural Science. Cambridge: Cambridge U.P., 2001.
 Harrisville, Roy A. & Walter Sundberg. The Bible in Modern Culture: Baruch Spinoza to Brevard Childs. 2nd ed. Grand Rapids: Eerdmans, 2001.
 Knight, Douglas A. and Gene M. Tucker, eds. The Hebrew Bible and Its Modern Interpreters. Philadelphia: Fortress/Chico: Scholars Press, 1985.
 Nicholson, Ernest W. The Pentateuch in the Twentieth Century: The Legacy of Julius Wellhausen. Oxford: Clarendon, 1998. 
 Noll, Mark A. Between Faith and Criticism: Evangelicals, Scholarship, and the Bible in America. Harper & Row, 1986. 
 Reventlow, Henning Graf. The Authority of the Bible and the Rise of the Modern World. Tr. J. Bowden. Philadelphia: Fortress, 1985. 
 Sherwood, Yvonne and Stephen D. Moore. The Invention of the Biblical Scholar: A Critical Manifesto. Fortress, 2011.
 Sperling, S. David. Students of the Covenant: A History of Jewish Biblical Scholarship in North America. Atlanta Scholars Press, 1992.
 Sugirtharajah, R.S. The Bible and the Third World: Precolonial, Colonial, and Postcolonial Encounters. Cambridge: Cambridge U.P., 2001.

External links

 
 
 
 
  (Parallel Bible with non-English translations, list of multidisciplinary resources)